Frederick William Kettle (5 February 1875 – 3 March 1951) was an English footballer, who played as a goalkeeper. Kettle spent most of his career at local amateur side Harwich & Parkeston, with whom he reached the final of the FA Amateur Cup in 1899, but he spent one season as a professional, with the then reigning FA Cup holders Sheffield United, as a backup to William "Fatty" Foulke. Kettle began his footballing career in Gibraltar, being stationed there for two years with the Royal Engineers, before returning home and being signed by Harwich & Parkeston. After a season at Sheffield United, Kettle intended to re-sign for his hometown club as an amateur, but as his application failed, he could not play amateur football, and missed the 1900–01 season altogether. He later played for Colchester amateur side Colchester Crown.

Kettle was born at the town of Dovercourt, near Harwich, in Essex, and died there at the age of 76.

References

1875 births
1951 deaths
Footballers from Essex
English footballers
Association football goalkeepers
Harwich & Parkeston F.C. players
Sheffield United F.C. players